San Lazzaro di Savena is a railway station serving San Lazzaro di Savena, in the region of Emilia-Romagna, northern Italy. The station opened in 2008 and is located on the Adriatic railway. The train services are operated by Trenitalia Tper.

The station is currently managed by Rete Ferroviaria Italiana (RFI), a subsidiary of Ferrovie dello Stato Italiane (FSI), Italy's state-owned rail company.

Location
San Lazzaro di Savena railway station is situated north of the city centre.

History
The station was opened on 30 July 2008.

Features
The station does not feature any building.

It consists of two tracks linked by an underpass.

Train services

The station is served by the following service(s):

 Suburban services (Treno suburbano) on line S4B, Bologna - Imola

See also

 List of railway stations in Bologna
 List of railway stations in Emilia-Romagna
 Bologna metropolitan railway service

References 

Railway stations in Emilia-Romagna
Railway stations opened in 2008